is a Japanese voice actor affiliated with Atomic Monkey.

Biography
Enoki was born in Tokyo. He became interested in acting while in college. After watching Gurren Lagann, he became a voice actor. He was a member of the Atomic Monkey Voice Actor & Acting Laboratory's third graduating class. His cousin is Chika Anzai. He is the Japanese dubbing voice actor of Tom Holland, who is known for his role in the Marvel Cinematic Universe as Spider-Man.

Filmography

Anime series

Original video animation

Original net animation

Anime films

Video games
2011 
 Starry ☆ Sky ~ After Autumn ~, Satochin 
2013 
 Ozmafia!!, Hansel 
 Majolica Familia, Knight Angel Satsuel, Devil Staff Aja
 Muv-Luv Alternative Chronicles 04
2014 
 Hakuoki SSL: Sweet School Life 
2015
 I-Chu, Li Chaoyang
 The Idolmaster SideM, Rui Maita
 OZMAFIA !! -vivace-, Hansel 
 Granblue Fantasy, Tomoi
 Touken Ranbu, Horikawa Kunihiro 
 Walpurgis no Uta [PS Vita], Usa 
 100 Sleeping Princes and the Kingdom of Dreams, Gerber 
2016
 Ikemen Revolution:The Magic of Love with Alice,  Luka Clemence 
 Endride: X Fragments, Celeste
 Cardfight!! Vanguard G: Stride to Victory!!, Shion Kiba
 Cocktail Prince, Salty Dog
 Quiz RPG: The World of Mystic Wiz, Sact Ogami
 Summon Night 6: Lost Borders, Sol 
 Nil Admirari no Tenbin: Teito Genwaku Kitan, Taro Tsubameno
 Beyblade Burst, Shu Kurenai
 Hagane Orchestra, Kajika
 Magical Days the Brats Parade, Ciel 
2017
 Anidol Colors, Kanamori Rikuto 
 Dear My Magical Boys, Arata Saiga
 Hiragana Boys, Chi
 Mitra Sphere  
 The Idolmaster: SideM Live on St@ge!, Rui Maita
2018
 Collar x Malice -Unlimited-, Chisato Tachibana 
 IDOL FANTASY, Mitsu Kumanoko
 Library Cross Infinite, Momo
 On-Air!, Kojo Arata 
 Beyblade Burst Battle Zero, Shu Kurenai 
 Starry Palette, Kazuyuki Igarashi
 Tsumugu Logic, Taki Tsumugu 
 Super Robot Wars X-Ω, Jona Basta
 Yo-kai Watch: Puni Puni, Kenjin Amaterasu
2019
 Caste Heaven, Yoichiro Tatsumi
 DANKIRA!!! - Boys, be DANCING!, Miki Nozomu 
 Kengan Ultimate Battle, Cosmo Imai
 Mobile Suit Gundam: Extreme Vs., Jona Basta
 Extraordinary Ones (Non Human Academy), Thundershingles
 Graffiti Smash, Chiado
 Pika-chin Kitto: Pochitto Puzzle, Aito Rom
2020
 Death end re;Quest 2, Arata Mizunashi 
 Fire Emblem: Three Houses, Yuri
 WIND BOYS!, Kannoto Mikio 
 Cupid Parasite, Keisaiin F. Ruki 
 Meiji Katsugeki Haikara Ryuuseigumi: Seibai Shimaseu, Hisashi Nango 
 Shin Megami Tensei III: Nocturne HD Remaster, Demi-Fiend
2021
 Scarlet Nexus, Yuito Sumeragi
Paradigm Paradox, Mihaya Araki
Shin Megami Tensei V, Demi-Fiend
2022
 No More Heroes III, Damon Ricotello
 JoJo's Bizarre Adventure: All Star Battle R, Pannacotta Fugo
Fitness Boxing: Fist of the North Star, Bat
2023
 Octopath Traveler II, Crick

Live-action

Dubbing

Film
Tom Holland
Captain America: Civil War – Peter Parker / Spider-Man
Edge of Winter – Bradley Baker
Spider-Man: Homecoming – Peter Parker / Spider-Man
The Current War – Samuel Insull
Avengers: Infinity War – Peter Parker / Spider-Man
Avengers: Endgame – Peter Parker / Spider-Man
Spider-Man: Far From Home – Peter Parker / Spider-Man
The Devil All the Time – Arvin Russell
Cherry – Cherry
Spider-Man: No Way Home – Peter Parker / Spider-Man
Uncharted – Nathan Drake
Alita: Battle Angel – Tanji (Jorge Lendeborg Jr.)
Another Round – Jonas (Magnus Sjørup)
Black Adam – Albert Rothstein / Atom Smasher (Noah Centineo)
Cloudy Mountain – Hong Yizhou (Zhu Yilong)
Escape Room – Danny Khan (Nik Dodani)
The Hate U Give – Chris Bryant (KJ Apa)
It – Victor "Vic" Criss (Logan Thompson)
Mad Max: Fury Road (2019 THE CINEMA edition) – Nux (Nicholas Hoult)
Tomb Raider – Nitin (Antonio Aakeel)

Drama
Blindspot – Vanya Petrushev (Alex Ozerov)
A Discovery of Witches – Marcus Whitmore (Edward Bluemel)
Outlander – Ian Murray (John Bell)
Squid Game – Hwang Jun-ho (Wi Ha-joon)
The Staircase – Clayton Peterson (Dane DeHaan)
The Thundermans – Oyster  (Tanner Stine)

Animation
What If...? – Peter Parker / Spider-Man

Documentary
Joshua: Teenager vs. Superpower – Joshua Wong

Other
The Chef Show - Tom Holland

References

External links
Official agency profile 

1988 births
Living people
Japanese male video game actors
Japanese male voice actors
Male voice actors from Tokyo
21st-century Japanese male actors